The Constitution of the Year III was the constitution of the French First Republic that established the Executive Directory. Adopted by the convention on 5 Fructidor Year III (22 August 1795) and approved by plebiscite on 6 September. Its preamble is the Declaration of the Rights and Duties of Man and of the Citizen of 1795.

It remained in effect until the coup of 18 Brumaire (9 November 1799) effectively ended the Revolutionary period and began the rise to power of Napoleon Bonaparte. It was more conservative than the not implemented, radically democratic French Constitution of 1793. 

Largely the work of political theorist Pierre Daunou, it established a bicameral legislature; an upper body known as the Council of Ancients, and a lower house, or Council of 500. This was intended to slow down the legislative process, in reaction to the wild swings of policy resulting from the unicameral National Assembly, Legislative Assembly, and National Convention. 

All taxpaying French males over 25 were eligible to vote in primary elections, subject to a one year residence provision; it is estimated these totalled around 5 million, more than the 4 million under the 1791 Constitution. They selected 30,000 electors, over the age of 30 and income equivalent to 150 days taxes, who in turn voted for the Council of 500.      

A five-man Directory, chosen by lot each year, constituted the executive branch. The central government retained great power, including emergency powers to curb freedom of the press and freedom of association. The Declaration of Rights and Duties of Mankind at the beginning of the constitution included an explicit ban on slavery.  It was succeeded by the Constitution of the Year VIII, which established the Consulate.

Timeline of French constitutions

References

Sources
 

1795 in law
Constitution
Constitutions of France
Defunct constitutions
1795 events of the French Revolution
Legal history of France
1795 documents
French Directory